Bart Vanheule (born 10 November 1983) is a Belgian professional road bicycle racer who rode for UCI Professional Continental team  between 2006 and 2009.

Palmarès 

2005
2nd Belgian National Time Trial Championships

References

1983 births
Living people
Belgian male cyclists
Sportspeople from Ghent
Cyclists from East Flanders
Flemish sportspeople